Debate exists as to whether the earliest Church Fathers in Christian history believed in the doctrine of the Trinity – the Christian doctrine that God the Father, God the Son (Jesus Christ) and God the Holy Spirit are three distinct persons sharing one  (essence).

Some of the evidence used to support an early belief in the Trinity are triadic statements (referring to the Father, Son and Holy Spirit) from the New Testament and the Church Fathers. The view that the Son was "of the substance of the Father, God of God[...] very God of very God" was formally ratified at the First Council of Nicaea in 325 AD. The Holy Spirit was included at the First Council of Constantinople (381 AD), where the relationship between the Father, Son and Holy Spirit as one substance and three co-equal persons was formally ratified.

Introduction
Some Trinitarians say the doctrine of the Trinity was revealed during the time that the New Testament was written; others state that it was revealed in the Patristic period (–451/787 AD). Nontrinitarians, on the other hand, generally state that the traditional doctrine of the Trinity did not exist until centuries after the end of the New Testament period. Some Trinitarians agree with this, seeing a development over time towards a true understanding of the Trinity. Trinitarians sometimes refer to Christian belief about God before the traditional statements on the Trinity as unsophisticated, 'naive', or 'incipient Trinitarianism', and that early Christians were 'proto-Trinitarian, partially Trinitarian'. Unitarians and some Trinitarians state that this means that those early Christians were not actually Trinitarians.

Expressions which link together the name of the Father, the Son, and the Holy Spirit occurred very early in the History of the Christian Church. These are sometimes taken as expressions about the Trinity. Other times, they are referred to more generally as 'triadic'. It is stated by some that "these passages cannot immediately be taken as evidence of the belief in the co-substantial unity of God; names may be conjoined for any number of reasons (e.g. unity in greeting, unity of purpose, etc.) so even the use of a threefold formula cannot be conclusive".

Two examples appear in the New Testament: 2 Corinthians 13:13 and Matthew 28:19. The context of 2 Corinthians 13:14 (verse 13 in the Vulgate and the NRSV), which is the close of a letter, suggests the church's conjunction of the Father, Son and Holy Spirit may have originated as a doxological formula; while the context of Matthew 28:19, the Great Commission, shows that the verbal conjunction of the Father, Son, and Holy Spirit was used early on as a baptismal formula. Unitarians hold that "the Father, Son and Holy Spirit are mentioned together [in the New Testament] in the same context, but not in any way that suggests they are all distinct persons who together comprise the totality of God"; a "literary triad does not equate to an ontological triunity".

This triadic pattern is even more marked in the glimpses available of the early Church's liturgy and day-to-day catechetical practice. Even so, some have said that the "indications from the apostolic and sub-apostolic writers are that [their] triadic formulas[...] do not carry the same significance as post-Nicene triadic formulas". The oldest extant work in which the word "Trinity" itself (Greek ) is used is Theophilus of Antioch's 2nd-century To Autolycus. There it is used to refer to God, his word and his wisdom. The view that the Son was "of the essence of the Father, God of God[...] very God of very God" was formally ratified at the First Council of Nicaea in 325 AD. The Holy Spirit was included at the First Council of Constantinople (381 AD), where the relationship between the Father, Son and Holy Spirit as one substance and three co-equal persons was formally ratified.

First century
The Didache uses the Gospel of Matthew only and no other known Gospel, and thus it must have been written before the four-Gospel canon had become widespread in the churches, i.e. before the second half of the 2nd century when Tatian produced the Diatessaron. Given its literary dependence on the Gospel of Matthew, it is not surprising that the Didache follows the Gospel of Matthew in designating a triadic formula as the baptismal formula:

Scholars such as Clayton N. Jefford have noted that Jesus is not "ever specifically given a designation of divinity within the text. He is simply called "servant, child" in the prayers and referenced as "the Lord" elsewhere." Jefford argues that this may have been for reasons of cultural sensitivity. Specifically towards Jews, as their beliefs on deity (found in the Torah at Deuteronomy 6:4) stand in opposition to belief in a triune God. This allows for a reading of Didache that harmonises fully with the Jewish perspective on God. This allows the reader to come away unoffended, and thus the text can be correctly read without invocation of a triune God.

Some scholars, however, disagree with Jefford's conclusion on cultural sensitivity. They argue that such caution was impossible to exercise as they believe the trinity doctrine had not yet been developed. For example, the Encyclopedia Britannica says of the trinity "The doctrine developed gradually over several centuries". This position would mean it was impossible for Jefford's conclusion on cultural sensitivity to be correct, since these scholars say "It was not until later in the 4th century that the distinctness of the three and their unity were brought together in a single orthodox doctrine of one essence and three persons." However, other scholars disagree with this conclusion and argued that proto-trinitarian formula and teaching can be found there.

Second century

Early second century: Ignatius of Antioch
Ignatius, second bishop of Antioch, who was martyred in Rome around 110 AD, wrote a series of letters to churches in Asia Minor on his way to be executed in Rome. The conjunction of Father, Son and Holy Spirit appears in his letter to the Magnesian church:

Unitarians argue that Ignatius is not indicating that the Father, the Son and the Spirit "are one substance anymore than he is saying flesh and spirit are one substance".

: Polycarp of Smyrna
Polycarp was martyred in Smyrna (where he was also Bishop) in the year 155. It is said by Irenaeus of Lyons that he was a pupil of the Apostle John. In his final prayer before his martyrdom, he "praises, glorifies, and blesses" the Father, Son, and Holy Spirit:

169–181: Theophilus of Antioch
Theophilus of Antioch's  is the oldest extant work that uses the actual word "Trinity" to refer to God, his Word and his Wisdom. The context is a discussion of the first three days of creation in Genesis 1–3:

It is maintained by some that "Theophilus does not use  to mean 'three-in-one', but rather simply uses it to indicate that there were three things before man, God and His Word and His Wisdom"; that he, like other second and third century authors, was referring to "a "trinity", triad or threesome, but not a triune or tripersonal God".

In contrast to Trinitarian theology, Theophilus of Antioch did not view the Son as an eternally self existing person. Theophilus wrote that God "begat Him, emitting Him along with His own wisdom before all things." Instead of speaking of the Word as the Creator, Theophilus speaks of the "Word as a helper in the things that were created by Him", thus he assigns the role of Creator to God alone, while assigning the lesser position of "helper" to the "begat" Son. Many scholars believe this viewpoint is inconsistent with Theophilus believing in a trinity. For example, Dr. Norman Geisler comments: "There are no exceptions; Christ is the Creator of all things including angels and everything visible or invisible. Since Christ could not be both the Creator of everything and at the same time a creature Himself, it is necessary to conclude that He is Himself the uncreated Creator of all creation". It is noteworthy that Theophilus specified that only 1 of the 3 mentioned is God. Even in his most famous quote "Trinity, of God, and His Word, and His wisdom", Theophilus only identifies one of the three as God. The other two are described as being parts or aspects of this God ("His" Word and "His" Wisdom). Neither does Theophilus describe the Word and Wisdom as persons. He simply says "God, then, having His own Word internal within His own bowels, begat Him, emitting Him along with His own wisdom before all things." The viewpoint held by Theophilus of both the Word (whom he later identified as the Son) and God's Wisdom, as both being emitted at some point in time, would seem to conflict with the Trinitarian viewpoint of God being eternal, uncreated, equal and self existing.

Third century: Theology in response to Patripassianism and Sabellianism
In the early 3rd century Tertullian and Hippolytus of Rome wrote Against Praxeas and Against Noetus, respectively, which are sometimes considered the first extant expository treatments of Trinitarian theology. Both authors use the word Trinity, but the term was yet to have its Trinitarian meaning. They wrote these works to combat Patripassianism, the view that the Father suffered on the cross along with the Son. In the 3rd century there were also Trinitarian theologies expressed in writings against Monarchianism,  Sabellianism and Modalism.

216: Tertullian
Tertullian's treatise against a Patripassian heretic named Praxeas, who claimed that the Father had suffered with the Son on the cross, is arguably the oldest extant treatise with a detailed explicit Trinitarian theology. In his Against Praxeas Tertullian wrote:

Others, however, argue that Tertullian was unitarian, claiming that Tertullian's use of the word "trinity" differs from later Trinitarian use: "For Tertullian, the one God is not the Trinity; rather, the one God is a member of the trinity"; "...Tertullian's trinity [was] not a triune God, but rather a triad or group of three, with God as the founding member".

: Hippolytus of Rome
In the early 3rd century, Hippolytus of Rome wrote a treatise Against Noetus, in response to a Christian from Smyrna named Noetus who had been promoting Patripassian views, which Hippolytus deemed heretical. Noetus and other Patripassians, such as Praxeas, claimed that the Father as well as the Son had suffered on the cross. Like Tertullian, Hippolytus explicitly used the word Trinity in his treatise against Patripassian views:

Some, referring to other parts of Against Noetus along with Hippolytus' The Refutation of All Heresies, view Hippolytus as nontrinitarian, saying that "in his theology, the divine (but less divine than God) Logos came to exist from God a finite time ago, so that God could create the cosmos by means of him. On two counts, then, this makes him not a trinitarian – that the "persons" are neither co-equal nor equally divine".

: Origen
Origen's On First Principles ( or ) is the oldest extant Christian theological treatise.  Origen's theology of the godhead is developed in this treatise, which reveals that by this time the use of the word Trinity to refer to Father, Son and Holy Spirit is standard in orthodox churches. However, it is argued that the word still did not have its later, Trinitarian meaning.

However, it is also argued in contradistinction that the word Trinity is utilized with a very similar meaning to its fourth century use.

Some see Origen as holding what many scholars refer to as a "subordinist" Christology: in Origen, "the Son and Spirit are always in some sense derivative of, less than, and subordinate to their source, the one God, that is, the Father":

From this, it is argued that Origen was in fact unitarian. Others, however, see Origen as teaching the ineffable begetting of the Son and procession of the Spirit as the unity of power and operation. In this view the Son and Spirit have no less power than the Father, by virtue of literally being his power. Both the Nicene and Athanasian Creeds affirm the Son is begotten of, and the Spirit proceeding from, the Father, co-equally and co-eternally.

: Novatian
Novatian, presbyter of Rome, wrote  the oldest extant Christian treatise that is specifically dedicated to and entitled On the Trinity. It was written in response to a number of views deemed heretical by Novatian, and particularly against Sabellius, who had maintained that the Trinity was divided into three prosopa, or "characters by which God is revealed to man, the Trinity being one of revelation, not essence".

Some, referring to chapter 31 of On the Trinity, maintain that when Novatian referred to Christ as 'God' he was still excluding him from being 'the one true God'.

262: Pope Dionysius
According to Athanasius of Alexandria, in the mid-3rd century Pope Dionysius wrote a letter to Dionysius of Alexandria criticizing Sabellius's views on the relations between the Son and the Father, as well as some who attempted to refute Sabellius's views. He quotes parts of Dionysius' letter in On the decrees of the Council of Nicaea . In this letter it is clear that Dionysius used the word Trinity (Greek ) to explicate the relations between Father, Son and Holy Spirit:

{{blockquote|Next, I may reasonably turn to those who divide and cut to pieces and destroy that most sacred doctrine of the Church of God, the Divine Monarchy, making it as it were three powers and partive subsistences and godheads. I am told that some among you who are catechists and teachers of the Divine Word, take the lead in this tenet, who are diametrically opposed, so to speak, to Sabellius' opininons; for he blasphemously says that the Son is the Father, and Father the Son, but they in some sort preach three Gods, as dividing the sacred Unity into three subsistences foreign to each other and utterly separate. For it must be that with the God of the Universe, the Divine Word is united, and the Holy Ghost must repose and habitate in God; thus in one as in a summit, I mean the God of the Universe, must the Divine Trinity be gathered up and brought together[...] Neither, then, may we divide into three godheads the wonderful and divine Unity[...] Rather, we must believe in God, the Father Almighty; and in Christ Jesus, his Son; and in the Holy Spirit; and that the Word is united to the God of the universe. 'For,' he says, 'The Father and I are one,' and 'I am in the Father, and the Father in me'. For thus both the Divine Trinity and the holy preaching of the Monarchy will be preserved.|'De decretis Nic. syn.26}}

265: Gregory the Wonderworker
Gregory was Bishop of Neocaesarea in Asia Minor, and wrote a Declaration of Faith'' which treats the Trinity as standard theological vocabulary:

Notes

References

Trinitarianism